Panurgus is a genus of mining bees belonging to the family Andrenidae, subfamily Panurginae.

Description
Panurgus species are small to medium in size, reaching . Most species (subgenus Panurgus s.str.) are almost entirely black. The hair is relatively sparse, but the male has a thick, long, black facial hair. The body surface area largely bald and shiny. The abdomen has a typical, slightly diamond-shaped outline.

Panurgus have one generation per year, adults can be found especially in late Summer. They are dependent on Asteraceae as a pollen source and they prefers yellow flowers. The nests are laid in sandy soil or loess.

Distribution
These bees are confined entirely to the Palearctic realm, the range extends from the Canary Islands to China and Japan.

Species

Subgenus Flavipanurgus Warncke, 1972

 Panurgus flavus Friese, 1897
 Panurgus fuzetus Patiny, 1999
 Panurgus granadensis Warncke, 1987
 Panurgus ibericus Warncke, 1972
 Panurgus merceti Vachal, 1910
 Panurgus venustus Erichson, 1835

Subgenus Panurgus Panzer, 1806

 Panurgus banksianus (Kirby, 1802)
 Panurgus calcaratus (Scopoli, 1763)

Subgenus Simpanurgus Warncke, 1972

 Panurgus acutus Patiny, 2002
 Panurgus afghanensis Warncke, 1972
 Panurgus annulipes (Lucas, 1846)
 Panurgus arctos (Erichson, 1806)
 Panurgus avarus Warncke, 1972
 Panurgus buteus Warncke, 1972
 Panurgus calceatus Pérez, 1895
 Panurgus canarius Warncke, 1972
 Panurgus canescens Latreille, 1811
 Panurgus canohirtus Friese, 1922
 Panurgus catulus Warncke, 1972
 Panurgus cavannae Gribodo, 1880
 Panurgus cephalotes Latreille, 1811
 Panurgus convergens Pérez, 1895
 Panurgus corsicus Warncke, 1972
 Panurgus cyrenaikensis Warncke, 1972
 Panurgus dargius Warncke, 1972
 Panurgus dentatus Friese, 1901
 Panurgus dentipes Latreille, 1811
 Panurgus farinosus Warncke, 1972
 Panurgus friesei Mocsary, 1894
 Panurgus intermedius Rozen, 1971
 Panurgus maroccanus Pérez, 1895
 Panurgus meridionalis Patiny, Ortiz-Sánchez & Michez, 2005
 Panurgus minor Warncke, 1972
 Panurgus nasutus Spinola, 1838
 Panurgus nigriscopus Pérez, 1895
 Panurgus niloticus Warncke, 1972
 Panurgus oblitus Warncke, 1972
 Panurgus ovatulus Warncke, 1972
 Panurgus perezi Saunders, 1882
 Panurgus phyllopodus Warncke, 1972
 Panurgus pici Pérez, 1895
 Panurgus platymerus Pérez, 1895
 Panurgus posticus Warncke, 1972
 Panurgus pyropygus Friese, 1901
 Panurgus rungsii Benoist, 1937
 Panurgus siculus Morawitz, 1872
 Panurgus sidensis Warncke, 1987
 Panurgus soikai Pittioni, 1950
 Panurgus vachali Pérez, 1895
 Panurgus variegatus Morawitz, 1876

References
 Charles D. Michener: The Bees of the World. 2nd Edition. The Johns Hopkins University Press, Baltimore 2007
 Biolib
 Fauna Europaea

Andrenidae
Bee genera